The 1955–56 Montenegrin Republic League was 11th season of Montenegrin Republic League. Season began in March 1956 and ended in May same year.

Season 

As nine Montenegrin teams played in 1955-56 edition of Yugoslav First League and Yugoslav Second League, third tier of competition became Competition of Titograd Football Association (Titogradski podsavez).
Divided in two groups (Southern and Northern), competition had eight participants. Among them, for the first and only time was one team from non-Montenegrin territory, GOŠK Dubrovnik (SR Croatia). Because of that, results of GOŠK Dubrovnik are not included in the final table or in the all-time scores list of Montenegrin Republic League.

Southern group 
Title winner in Southern group was Bokelj, who was undefeated after six weeks.

Northern group 
Title winner in Northern group was Iskra, who was undefeated after six weeks.

Final table 
Winner of the season was Bokelj, who had one point more than Iskra. In final classification is not included score of GOŠK Dubrovnik.

Higher leagues 
On season 1955–56, nine Montenegrin teams played in higher leagues of SFR Yugoslavia. Budućnost was a member of 1955–56 Yugoslav First League, while Sutjeska, Lovćen, Arsenal, Radnički Nikšić, Mladost Titograd, Radnički Ivangrad, Jedinstvo Bijelo Polje and Jedinstvo Herceg Novi played in 1955–56 Yugoslav Second League.

See also 
 Montenegrin Republic League
Montenegrin Republic Cup (1947–2006)
Montenegrin clubs in Yugoslav football competitions (1946–2006)
Montenegrin Football Championship (1922–1940)

References 

Montenegrin Republic League